"Love Song" is a song written by Steven Runkle, and recorded by American country music group The Oak Ridge Boys.  It was released in June 1983 as the second single from the album American Made.  The song was The Oak Ridge Boys' eighth number one country single.  The single went to number one for one week and spent a total of twelve weeks on the country chart.

Charts

Weekly charts

Year-end charts

References

1983 singles
1983 songs
The Oak Ridge Boys songs
Song recordings produced by Ron Chancey
MCA Records singles